Dog pox is an infection of canines which may be caused by the canine herpes virus, and can result in symptoms ranging from no symptoms to inflammation of the respiratory or digestive tract to skin inflammation and lesions. Over 60% of adult male dogs exhibit lesions as a result of this infection. It can result in reduction of epithelial function in the intestine.

References

Dog diseases